The 1961 European Rowing Championships were rowing championships held on the Vltava (Moldau) in the Czechoslovakian capital Prague. The event for women was held from 18 to 20 August, and 9 countries competed with 32 boats. The event for men was held from 24 to 27 August, and 20 countries entered boats. Men competed in all seven Olympic boat classes (M1x, M2x, M2-, M2+, M4-, M4+, M8+), and just three countries entered boats in all classes: the hosts Czechoslovakia, the Soviet Union, and a combined German team. Women entered in five boat classes (W1x, W2x, W4x+, W4+, W8+). The regatta was held in five lanes, with rowers proceeding in the direction of the river's flow.

German representation

Germany had to enter a combined team. The women from both countries had a qualification event on the Langer See in Grünau, which had previously been used as the rowing venue for the 1936 Summer Olympics. The West Germans entered the three sculling boat classes only (W1x, W2x, W4x+), and in all events, the East Germans won the competition. East German teams for the coxed four and the eight complemented a complete team.

East Germany nominated its men at the end of July, and following the West German national championships, the West Germans nominated their men's team in early August. There were difficult negotiations between West and East German representatives as to the location for the German qualifications. In the end, the regatta facility on the Templiner See in Potsdam favoured by East Germany was agreed to. The German qualifications were decided on 12 August, with West Germany winning all seven races.

Medal summary
Medallists at the 1961 European Rowing Championships were:

Women's events
Of the nine countries that were represented, only three were from western Europe: Great Britain (coxed four, double scull, single scull), Belgium and the Netherlands (both single scull). Of those, only Britain managed to get two of their boats into the finals; Penny Chuter came fourth in the single scull, and they came fifth in the coxed four. The most successful nation in the women's events was the Soviet Union, with four out of a possible five gold medals.

Men's events
The most successful nation was the Soviet Union, which won three gold medals.

Medals tables 
The first table shows the aggregate results for men and women with Germany counted as one country. The overall winner was the Soviet Union with seven gold medals, followed by Germany and then Italy with two gold medals each, but Germany also winning three silver medals whilst Italy did not win silver.

The second table shows the aggregate results for men and women with East Germany and West Germany counted as separate countries; all male German winners were West Germans while all female German winners were from the east. The overall winner remains the Soviet Union with seven gold medals, followed by West Germany and then Italy with two gold medals each, but West Germany also winning one silver medal whilst Italy did not win silver. East Germany is ranked sixth with this method of counting medals.

References

European Rowing Championships
European Rowing Championships
Rowing
Rowing
Rowing
Sports competitions in Prague